Archirhoe multipunctata is a species of geometrid moth in the family Geometridae.

The MONA or Hodges number for Archirhoe multipunctata is 7298.

References

Further reading

 
 

Hydriomenini
Articles created by Qbugbot
Moths described in 1906